Xiong Yan (died 848 BC) was the ninth viscount of the state of Chu during the Western Zhou Dynasty of ancient China.  Like other early Chu rulers, he held the hereditary noble rank of viscount first granted to his ancestor Xiong Yi by King Cheng of Zhou.

Xiong Yan succeeded his older brother Xiong Zhi, who abdicated due to illness.  The Records of the Grand Historian (Shiji) says that he killed Xiong Zhi and usurped the throne, but this account is contradicted by earlier history books Zuo Zhuan and Guoyu.

Xiong Yan died in 848 BC and was succeeded by his elder son Xiong Yong.  His younger son, also Xiong Yan (熊嚴, different in Chinese characters), ascended the throne after Xiong Yong's death.

References

Monarchs of Chu (state)
848 BC deaths
Year of birth unknown
9th-century BC Chinese monarchs